The Mutants is a 1998 Portuguese film by director Teresa Villaverde, starring Ana Moreira and Alexandre Pinto. It was screened in the Un Certain Regard section at the 1998 Cannes Film Festival.

Cast
 Ana Moreira – Andreia
 Alexandre Pinto – Pedro
 Nelson Varela – Ricardo
 Alexandra Lencastre – Social Worker
 Paulo Pereira – Zezito
 Helder Tavares – Franklin
 Teresa Roby – Pedro's Mother
 António Capelo – Pedro's Father
 Jorge Bruno Gomes – Pedro's Brother
 Samuel Costa – João Paulo
 Carlos Castilho – Artur
 Maria Tengarrinha – Julia
 Marta Sofia Vargas – Paula
 Isabel Ruth – Isabel

Awards
This film was nominated for four Golden Globes, Portugal which were:
 Best Film: Teresa Villaverde 
 Best Director: Teresa Villaverde 
 Best Actor: Alexandre Pinto 
 Best Actress: Ana Moreira

References

External links
 

1998 films
1990s Portuguese-language films
1998 drama films
Films directed by Teresa Villaverde
Portuguese drama films